Fresh Creek was a district of the Bahamas before 1996.  It consisted of the central portion of the island of Andros. The population (1995) was 2,576.

New districts were created on Andros in 1996. Fresh Creek district was roughly replaced by Central Andros.

The area is popular among tourists on angling holidays.  One popular form of fishing there is fly fishing for Bonefish.

Fresh Creek is a tidal creek near Coakley Town and Andros Town, North Andros.

References

Former districts of the Bahamas
Andros, Bahamas
Rivers of the Bahamas